Marina Pilia is the current Minister for Justice of Abkhazia. Pilia was appointed on 17 October 2014 by newly elected President Raul Khajimba.

References

Living people
Ministers for Justice of Abkhazia
Year of birth missing (living people)